Angelica Wiratama (born 25 June 1999) is an Indonesian  badminton player affiliated with Exist Jakarta team.

Achievements

BWF World Tour (1 runner-up) 
The BWF World Tour, which was announced on 19 March 2017 and implemented in 2018, is a series of elite badminton tournaments sanctioned by the Badminton World Federation (BWF). The BWF World Tour is divided into levels of World Tour Finals, Super 1000, Super 750, Super 500, Super 300 (part of the HSBC World Tour), and the BWF Tour Super 100.

Mixed doubles

BWF International Challenge/Series (1 runner-up) 
Mixed doubles

  BWF International Challenge tournament
  BWF International Series tournament

Performance timeline

National team 
 Junior level

Individual competitions 
 Junior level

References

External links 
 

1999 births
Living people
Sportspeople from Jakarta
Indonesian female badminton players
21st-century Indonesian women